Nicolò Francesco Leonardo Grimaldi (5 April 1673 (bap) – 1 January 1732) was an Italian mezzo-soprano castrato who is best remembered today for his association with the composer George Frideric Handel, in two of whose early operas he sang. Grimaldi was usually known by his stage name of Nicolini.

Nicolini was born in Naples, where he made his operatic début in 1685. He also sang sacred music as a soprano in the Cathedral and Royal Chapel (to which extant libretti from the 1690s identify him as virtuoso). Between 1697 and 1731 he sang many operatic roles at various Italian cities in works by composers such as Alessandro Scarlatti, Nicola Porpora, Leonardo Vinci, and Johann Adolf Hasse. Other composers who wrote major roles for him included Francesco Provenzale (who was his teacher), Pollarolo, Ariosti, Lotti, Giovanni and Antonio Maria Bononcini, Caldara, Albinoni, Leo, and Riccardo Broschi.  Of more than a hundred productions in which he took part, thirty-six were in Naples, thirty-four in Venice, and fifteen in London.

Nicolini first visited London in 1708, where his fine singing and critically renowned acting were crucial to the success of Italian opera, and, more specifically, opera seria in London. In 1711 he created the title role in Handel's Rinaldo, a work whose immediate popularity was instrumental in the establishing of Handel's lengthy career in England. He also sang the title role in Handel's Amadigi in 1715 and continued to sing in London, usually in various pasticcios, until 1717. The eighteenth-century musicologist Charles Burney described Nicolini as "this great singer, and still greater actor", while Joseph Addison labelled him "the greatest performer in dramatic Music that is now living or that perhaps ever appeared on a stage". His Handel roles reveal that he possessed exceptional vocal agility and virtuosity. Between 1727-1730 he performed with Farinelli in Italy. In 1731 he planned to sing at Naples in Giovanni Battista Pergolesi's first opera seria, La Salustia, but became ill and died during rehearsals.

Further reading
 Charles Ancillon: Eunuchism display'd; describing all the different sorts of eunuchs; the esteem they have met with in the world, and how they came to be made so; wherein principally is examin'd, whether they are capable of marriage, and if they ought to be suffer'd to enter into that state; the whole confirm'd by the authority of civil, canon, and common law, and illustrated with many remarkable cases by way of precedent; also a comparison between Signior Nicolini and the three celebrated eunuchs now at Rome, viz. Pasqualini, Pauluccio, and Jeronimo (or Momo); with several observations on modern eunuchs; occasion'd by a young lady's falling in love with Nicolini, who sung in the opera at the Hay-market, and to whom she had like to have been married. Published 1718 by E. Curll in London.
Winton Dean: "Grimaldi, Nicolo", Grove Music Online ed L. Macy (Accessed 10 February 2007), grovemusic.com , subscription access.

Castrati
Italian opera singers
1670s births
1732 deaths
18th-century Italian male actors
Italian male stage actors
Directors of La Monnaie